Míškovice is a municipality and village in Kroměříž District in the Zlín Region of the Czech Republic. It has about 700 inhabitants.

History
The first written mention of Míškovice is from 1397.

Sights
The Church of Saint Anthony of Padua, designed by František Lydie Gahura, was built in 1927.

References

External links

 

Villages in Kroměříž District